Willem van Zeist (March 12, 1924 – October 7, 2016) was a Dutch archaeobotanist and palynologist. He was the director of the Biologisch-Archaeologisch Instituut at the University of Groningen.

Education
Van Zeist studied biology at the University of Utrecht, completing his PhD dissertation in 1955 on pollen analysis investigation in the Netherlands, with special reference to archaeology (Acta Botanica Neerlandica 4, 1955). From 1951 to 1989 he was linked to the Biologisch-Archaeologisch Instituut at the University of Groningen. He became lecturer there in 1967 and a professor in 1973.

Research

Europe
Van Zeist conducted research in Europe on the oldest recovered canoe in the world, the Pesse canoe found in the Netherlands. According to C14 dating analysis it was found to be constructed somewhere between 8200 and 7600 BC. This canoe is exhibited in the Drents Museum in Assen, Netherlands.

Van Zeist studied the vegetational history and peat bogs of southeastern Drenthe and concluded that Neolithic settlements had begun there around 5000 BC. He also concluded that the prehistoric disc wheels found in the Netherlands dated to at least the Neolithic period. Van Zeist also conducted analytical studies of pollen cores and charred seeds and fruits from archaeological excavations at Gasselte, Noordbarge, Odoorn, Peelo and Wijster. In 1983 he became a member of the Royal Netherlands Academy of Arts and Sciences.

Near East

In 1975, van Zeist began work on establishing the climatological record for the Near East with pollen analyses from Iran and Turkey. Along with other studies he concluded that there had only been relatively minor fluctuations in the climate of this area since 5500 BC. He conducted paleobotanical studies and dating analyses at various Near Eastern archaeological sites such as Tell Ramad, Tell Ghoraife, El Kowm, Ras Shamra, Cayonu, Ganj Dareh, Mureybet and Tell Aswad. At the latter site near Mount Hermon in Syria, he made a find of the earliest cultivated Emmer Wheat yet found anywhere on Earth to date, along with what he considered to be domesticated peas and lentils along with other grains such as einkorn and barley at later stages.

Selected bibliography

References

1924 births
2016 deaths
Archaeobotanists
Archaeologists of the Near East
Dutch archaeologists
Members of the Royal Netherlands Academy of Arts and Sciences
People from Apeldoorn
Academic staff of the University of Groningen
Utrecht University alumni